SPT TV is a Portuguese language Television channel in the United States that is owned by Seabra Portuguese Television. The channel launched in 1986 and is available via cable and satellite. It is the first Portuguese-language television channel based in the US and features the best programming from Portugal as well as local programming created especially for the Portuguese diaspora in the US. In January 2007, SPT TV launched SIC Notícias in North America, in partnership with SIC.  It is currently available only on Dish Network.

SPT TV features programming from SIC, a private network in Portugal.  Programming includes news, entertainment, talk-shows, comedies, reality shows, sports, among other genres.

The official website ceased operation completely somewhere between January and March 2014 according to the available sources at the Wayback Machine on the Internet Archive.

Sport TV Americas
In August 2010, SPT TV partnered up with Portuguese Sports broadcaster Sport TV to launch Sport TV Americas, a North American version of the Portuguese sports service. The channel features exclusive coverage of Liga ZON Sagres with 5 live matches every weekend as well as coverage of the Portuguese second division, the League Cup and Portuguese Cup.

On June 5, 2013, for reasons exclusively imputable to RTP - USA Inc. dba SPT (Seabra Portuguese Television), SPORT TV Portugal S.A. was forced to restrain the access to the respective signal.

References

External links
 Sport TV Americas

Portuguese-language television stations
Television channels and stations established in 1986